San Pablo Canyon is a long narrow gorge in western Contra Costa County, California.

This canyon is located adjacent to Wildcat Canyon and forms the bulk of the watershed for San Pablo Creek. A large portion of the southern half of the valley is submerged by San Pablo Dam, forming San Pablo Reservoir. The lands of the canyon are largely undeveloped and are designated open space.

Landforms of Contra Costa County, California
Landforms of the San Francisco Bay Area
Geography of Richmond, California